Whisky Creek is a stream in the U.S. state of Washington. It is a tributary of the Touchet River.

Whisky Creek most likely was named for two local men who sold whiskey to Indians.

See also
List of rivers of Washington

References

Rivers of Columbia County, Washington
Rivers of Walla Walla County, Washington
Rivers of Washington (state)